Íngrid Felicitas Olderöck Benhard (1944 – March 17, 2001), better known as "Woman of The Dogs", was a Carabineros de Chile major who was converted to an agent of the DINA (Chilean Secret Police) in 1973. She was responsible for human rights violations during the first years of the military dictatorship of Chile.

Early life 
Olderöck was a descendant of Nazi-affiliated Germans -  her father came from Hamburg and her mother from Munich. She emigrated to Chile with her parents and sisters. According to Nancy Guzmán, journalist and author of the book Ingrid Olderöck: the woman with the dogs, the future agent was raised in a very authoritarian family environment where there was a certain contempt for Latin culture, considering it less prone to order. Her parents had their children learn using musical instruments, dancing or writing, and they had to speak German only.

She stated, while interviewed by Guzmán:

Human rights violations 
In October 1973 Olderöck entered the DINA with the rank of captain and participated in the Women's School of the institution, where around 70 women were instructed in the methods of torture as well as repressive tactics against opponents of the military dictatorship. According to sources, during the exercise of her functions in the DINA, she learned of the secrets related to the Project Andrea, led by the Pinochet military dictatorship to manufacture and apply sarin against opponents.

In 1974 the DINA created the first detention centers, among which was the Venda Sexy, where Olderöck would commit torture and rape by using a dog named "Volodya".

After her parents died, she had her own sister tortured to get the inheritance.

Attempted assassination 
On July 15, 1981, Olderöck was the victim of an attack perpetrated at her home. She was shot in the head by a commando from the Revolutionary Left Movement (MIR). Following this incident, she retired from the Carabineros. Olderöck maintained that, though carried out by the MIR, the attack had been planned by Carabineros in retaliation for her desertion. According to Nancy Guzmán, Olderöck "always insisted that the deceased General César Mendoza gave the order for her assassination and that it was Major Julio Benimelli who carried it out".

Death
Olderöck died on March 17, 2001, at the age of 57 due to an acute digestive hemorrhage. Her human rights violations thus went unpunished. While alive, she displayed signs of madness caused by the projectile lodged in her head after the attack.

Cultural reference 
The story of Olderöck served as inspiration for the animated short film Beast, directed by Hugo Covarrubias and released in 2021. The movie was nominated for an Oscar in the "best animated short film" category.

Notes

References

Further reading 

 

1944 births
2001 deaths
Chilean murderers
German emigrants to Chile
Chilean female murderers
Chilean criminals
People of the Dirección de Inteligencia Nacional
Chilean anti-communists
Carabineros_de_Chile